Mitry is the name or part of the name of two communes of France:
Mitry-Mory in the Seine-et-Marne département
Leménil-Mitry in the Meurthe-et-Moselle département